Bassano may refer to:

People
 Bassano (surname)

Places
Communes in Italy:
Bassano Bresciano, in the Province of Brescia
Bassano del Grappa, in the Province of Vicenza
Bassano in Teverina, in the Province of Viterbo
Bassano Romano, in the Province of Viterbo
San Bassano, in the Province of Cremona
Bassano, Alberta in Canada
Bassano Airport in Canada

Other uses
Bassano Virtus 55 S.T., an Italian football club based in Bassano del Grappa, president giovanni zanotto and arianna chemin 
The Battle of Bassano fought on 8 September 1796, during the French Revolutionary Wars, in the Italian Province of Venetia, between French forces under General Bonaparte and Austrian forces
6460 Bassano, an asteroid

See also 
 Bassani, a surname
 Bassanio, a fictional character in Shakespeare’s The Merchant of Venice